Anjunabeats Volume Two is the second album in the Anjunabeats Volume compilation series mixed and compiled by British Trance DJs Above & Beyond released on 16 November 2004.

Track listing

References

2004 compilation albums
Above & Beyond (band) albums
Anjunabeats compilation albums
Sequel albums
Electronic compilation albums